Chrysidea pumila is a species of cuckoo wasps belonging to the subfamily Chrysidinae. Some authors consider this species as a synonym of Trichrysis pumilionis Linsenmaier, 1987.

Description
The basic color of the body is metallic blue-green with golden reflections.

These cuckoo wasps parasitize Trypoxylon attenuatum (Sphecidae).

Distribution
This species is present in Europe (Spain, France, Switzerland, Austria, Germany, Hungary, Dalmatia, North Macedonia, Greece, Italy), in Southern Russia, in the Middle East and in North Africa.

References 

 Paolo Rosa and Zai-fu Xu Annotated type catalogue of the Chrysididae (Insecta, Hymenoptera) deposited in the collection of Maximilian Spinola (1780–1857), Turin

External links
  Biodiversidad Virtual

Chrysidinae
Insects described in 1845
Hymenoptera of Europe